Telejournal or Téléjournal may refer to:

 Le Téléjournal, a national television newscast from Radio-Canada
 Telejurnal, a national newscast from Romanian Television

See also
 Telegiornale (disambiguation), or TG, a typical name of Italian language television newscasts
 Telejornal (disambiguation), a typical name of Portuguese language television newscasts